Joel William Tabiner (born 30 November 2003) is an English professional footballer who plays as a midfielder for Crewe Alexandra.

Tabiner signed a scholarship deal with Crewe Alexandra's Academy in 2020.

He made his Crewe debut on 9 November 2021 in an EFL Trophy group game against Wolves Under-21s at Gresty Road.

On 4 February 2022, Tabiner joined Leek Town on a one-month youth loan deal, making his debut the following day in their 2-0 home win against City of Liverpool F.C. He signed his first professional deal with Crewe at the end of the 2021/22 season, and early the following season made his first Crewe start on 9 August 2022, playing in an EFL League Cup first round defeat at Grimsby Town. Tabiner started three consecutive league games in October 2022, but Crewe manager Alex Morris was being careful not to over-burden him: "He's not going to last games yet. He's an 18-year-old boy..., and we've got to make sure that we do not break him along the way."

Tabiner scored his first Crewe goal in a 4-3 win over Salford City at Gresty Road on 10 March 2023.

Career statistics

References

Living people
English footballers
English Football League players
Crewe Alexandra F.C. players
2003 births
Association football midfielders